St. Thomas Marthoma Church, also called as Kozhencherry Valiya Palli is a prominent Christian church under the Malankara Mar Thoma Syrian Church, 
The  Maramon Convention, the largest Christian gathering in Asia, is held in every February on the sand bed of Pamba which is near to the church. This is one of the oldest churches in Kerala, established in  AD 1599. In 1941 the new church was built adjacent to the old church. At the time of construction of the new church, this was the biggest Christian church building in the Central Travancore region.

Church history

Kochupally 

Certain ancient Christian families who resided on the banks of river Pampa have recorded their origins and these evidences speak of the early Christian settlers around Kozhencherry to have worshiped in the churches at Maramon and Chengannur. According to these records, the earliest church at Kozhencherry was constructed in AD 1599, according to the Malayalam Era (M.E. 775). The location of the church, a small thatched building was at Vennapra, a hilly area on the eastern part of the Mulayodil field which is situated towards the east of the present St. Thomas Marthoma Church Kozhencherry  The society in those days of Hindu domination was plagued by the evils of caste discrimination and untouchability. While the renovation of the church was in progress, the Kovilans demolished the church enraged by the supposed disrespect of some of the 'Mappilas'. The prominent Christians of the time organized themselves and brought their grievance to the attention of the then ruling King Maharaja Thekkumkur Kulasekhara. As a result, His Highness the Maharaja graciously granted the land which belonged to the Chengazhasseri illom (where the present Kochupalli is situated) and the land was exempted from giving tax by the authority of the seal of the Maharaja on a Chempola.

Worship was resumed in a temporary structure constructed on the north of the Kochupalli, where the present cemetery stands. The people of the locality joined the Maramon Church for worship until the church was re-established in Kozhencherry.

Around 950 M.E. (1774) a new church was established in the name of Virgin Mary in the location of the present Kochupalli.

Subsequent to the 'Naveekaranam' in Malankara Church, launched by Abraham Malpan, in 1012 M.E. (1836) the Malankara Syrian Church split into two factions one supporting naveekaranam (reformation) and the others who was against it, following a court order. As a result, reformist faction established them self as separate church known as Malankara Marthoma Syrian Church . The Kochupalli in Kozhencherry  was among the few churches allotted to the Marthoma church. Afterwards, the Marthomites and the Orthodox believers conducted their worship in the Kochupalli taking turns.

In 1069 M.E. (1893) the church was renovated. On the northern side of the compound wall, where the old church had existed, a piece of land was set apart for use as a cemetery. The expenses were met by the Marthomites. On finishing the work, the Orthodox were asked to meet a share of the expenses which was not obliged to by them. A court case was filed and the judgement asked the Orthodox to remit a share of the expenses if they were to conduct worship once in five times. But the orthodox were not prepared to comply with it. They secured a place of their own and established a parish church, which they could use with full freedom. This left the Kochupalli exclusively to the Marthomites. As the large majority of Christian families of this area continued to support Naveekaranam, the number of parishioners increased and the Kozhencherry Church grew stronger day by day.

St. Thomas Marthoma Valia Pally,  Kozhencherry 

In order to accommodate the increasing number of parishioners, it became inevitable to enlarge the Kochupalli. But there was strong opposition from the parishioners about demolishing the Kochupalli. Many of them wanted the Kochupalli to be kept intact as it was one of the very few buildings representing the antiquity and the treasured traditions of the Mar Thoma church. However, Edavaka sangham, the Parish General Body was aware of the inadequacy of the available plot and it was decided to secure a new plot and construct a new bigger church. Some were of the opinion that if a plot adjoining the church ground on the western side was purchased there would be enough space to construct a new church. But there was a pathway in between the two plots. The intervention of the influential Rev. C. P. Philipose was instrumental in arranging a new pathway in place of the old one. After this, the Mannurethu   plot on the western side of the church was bought and under the inspiring leadership of Kurumthottickal Thomas Kathanar II (Rev. K. T. Thomas), the initial steps were taken to build the new church.

Titus II Mar Thoma Metropolitan laid the foundation stone of the church on 8 Vrichikam 1108 M.E. (23-11-1932). Koikalethu Mathai Upadesi gave constant and able support to Rev. K. T. Thomas in constructing the church. On 8 April 1941, the dedication ceremony of the biggest church in Travancore at that time was led by Abraham Mar Thoma Metropolitan. According to the church records, it took only 46, 000/- for the entire construction of the church. Even today, the  imposing edifice, remarkable for its architectural beauty, with its walls built of perfectly shaped stones stands tall in Central Travancore in all its grandeur and majesty.

Today St Thomas Mar Thoma Church, Kozhencherry has a large congregation with more than 1780 families and about 13475 members. As a result of the efforts of the church, several institutions which have proved a blessing to many in the entire area have been established. A reputed college, an industrial training centre, separate high schools for boys and girls, a higher secondary school adjoining St. Thomas High School, an English medium senior secondary school, a pain and palliative care unit, a magnificent auditorium, shopping complexes  and a counseling centre in the area are all the contribution of the church for the public. The church has played a key role, in many ways the most significant role, in the development of Kozhencherry and its surrounding areas.

Institutions

Mar Thoma Senior Secondary School 
Mar Thoma Senior Secondary School, Kozhencherry was established in the year 1982. Since then the school has attained a supreme position in the academic arena of Central Kerala, aiming at the all-round development of personality. The school curriculum provides for mental and physical growth.

The school is situated in a calm and serene campus in the heart of Kozhencherry at a short distance from the Kozhencherry bus stand. The Mar Thoma Metropolitan is the patron and the vicar of the St. Thomas Mar Thoma Church, Kozhencherry is the Manager of the school.

St. Thomas Higher Secondary School 
The St. Thomas High school, Kozhencherry was established in the year 1910 and has been instrumental in moulding the lives of many leaders of today.

The School is situated at the heart of Kozhencherry town just a short distance from the St. Thomas Mar Thoma church, Kozhencherry. The school was upgraded to Higher Secondary level in the year 1998 incorporating the system of co-education at higher secondary level.

St. Mary's Girls High School 
St. Mary's Girls High School was founded in 1930. Since then the school has been imparting quality education to girl students.

Pain and palliative care 
The pain and palliative care unit was inaugurated on 24 August 2008 by Philipose Mar Chrysostom Valiya Metropolitan. Its purpose is to support severely ill and bed-ridden patients in and around Kozhencherry. Food Kits are deliveredto less-well-off patients by the team leaders, and monthly supplies of medicines are provided for patients who cannot afford to buy them. The services of doctors are made available to the patients in the unit by the help and support of the District Palliative Care unit operating at Kozhencherry Government Hospital.

References

External links 

Churches in Pathanamthitta district
Churches completed in 1941
1941 establishments in India
1599 establishments in India
Mar Thoma Syrian churches
Churches completed in 1599
16th-century churches in India
16th-century Oriental Orthodox church buildings
20th-century churches in India
20th-century Oriental Orthodox church buildings